Valtonen is a Finnish surname. Notable people with the surname include:

Jarmo Valtonen (born 1982), Finnish speed skater
Jonne Valtonen (born 1976), Finnish composer
Jorma Valtonen (born 1946), Finnish ice hockey player
Mato Valtonen (born 1955), Finnish actor and musician
Mauri Valtonen, Finnish astronomer
Osmo Valtonen, Finnish artist and sculptor
Tomek Valtonen (born 1980), Finnish ice hockey player

Finnish-language surnames